The  is a terms of use agreement for the content published online by Japanese government cabinet ministry websites. It was created in 2014. It allows the contents of cabinet ministry websites to be freely used, copied, publicly transmitted or otherwise modified, except when restricted by laws and ordinances.

Version 2.0 of the agreement was created in December 2015 and went into use starting in January 2016. Version 2.0 and later versions are compatible with the Creative Commons Attribution 4.0 International license (CC BY 4.0).

History 
 June 19, 2014 - Version 1.0 of the license was created.
 December 24, 2015 - Version 2.0 of the license was created.
January 2016 - Version 2.0 of the license went into effect.

Version history

Version 1.0 
When using content that is licensed under version 1.0, the user must comply with the following provisions:
 Provide references to the original work (attribution). 
 When using third party content (content not produced by the Government), it is the responsibility of the user to obtain consent to use the content. 
 Usage that violates Japanese laws and ordinances is prohibited. 
 Usage that represent threats to the safety of the Nation and/or the citizens is prohibited.

Version 1.1 
This version was created to apply to content produced by local governments. The terms of use were not changed from version 1.0.

Version 2.0 

In this version, the provisions in the terms of use that prohibited use in violation of laws and ordinances or the public order were deleted. This was done to ensure compatibility with the CC BY 4.0 license.

Evaluation 
The Japanese Open Knowledge Foundation said upon the release of version 1.0: "Making the content published by the websites of ministries freely available is a big step, but there are still concerns about the provisions that reference 'the public order', and international consistency". Kenji Hiramoto, an aide to the Japanese Government Chief Information Officer remarked that he is aware of this issue, but said "The important thing is to begin working on the government's open data".

References

External links 

  
 
 

Government of Japan
Licenses
Japanese copyright law